Vasantha Geetam is a 1984 Telugu-language drama film, produced by Bhimavarpu Buchi Reddy under the Jyothi Art Creations banner and directed by Singeetham Srinivasa Rao. It stars Akkineni Nageswara Rao, Radha  and music composed by Chakravarthy. The movie is a remake of director's own 1984 Kannada movie Shravana Banthu.

Plot
Kumar (Akkineni Nageswara Rao) is a famous singer, once in his musical tour, mysteriously a beautiful girl chases him in the form of a photograph. After that, he returns home, Kumar belongs to an orthodox Brahmin family and his father Parabrahma Sastry (Gummadi) adhere to customs & beliefs. One night Kumar gets a dream in which he views an ancient temple, surprising, next day he learns that it is Sivapuram temple when his soul pulls him towards the destination, so, he immediately moves. On the way, he gets acquainted with a strange person Varma (Nagesh), who speaks as if he knows him from the beginning when Kumar goes into dichotomy and not able to understand what is happening. Varma takes him to the temple where he gets the memories of reincarnation and Varma starts narrating their past to Kumar. Actually, Varma & Kumar are best friends in the previous life, Varma is the son of Zamindar whereas Kumar is an orphan and they share a bond beyond a casual friendship. Here Kumar is a great poet, Varma want to publish his work when he is heading for it he watches a dance program of a beautiful girl Madhavi (Radha), a Devadasi. Varma falls for her, she likes poetry written by Kumar, so, Varma bluffs it is his own work. But later Madhavi realizes the truth when Kumar & Madhavi start liking each other and their love blossoms. Meanwhile, Varma makes marriage arrangements with Madhavi convincing her mother Mandakini (Jhansi). During the time of marriage, Madhavi escapes, knowing it, Varma orders his henchmen to eliminate them as he is aware of the fact when Kumar & Madhavi about to marry the goons attack and beats them badly. By the time, Varma is awake it is too late, Kumar & Madhavi dies in his lap. Distressed, Varma commits suicide out of contrition, his soul still revolving around and he will not be freed until he makes penance for his sin. At present, Varma wants to reunite Kumar & Madhavi and he tells Kumar that Madhavi is also taken rebirth in a Christian family as Mary. Now Kumar plays a drama with the help of Varma makes Mary fall in his love. Surprisingly, Mary is the daughter of Kumar's maternal aunt Lakshmi (Athili Lakshmi) who has been exiled from the family for marrying a Christian Joseph (Kanta Rao). Due to the family disputes, both Jopesh & Parabrahma Sastry do not agree for this alliance. In this situation, Varma & Kumar again plays a drama along with Mary and make their parents realize their mistake. Finally, the movie ends on a happy note with the marriage of Kumar & Mary and Varma soul is revealed blessing the newly wedded couple.

Cast
Akkineni Nageswara Rao as Kumar 
Radha as Madhavi / Mary
Gummadi as Parabrahma Sastry 
Kanta Rao as Joseph
Nagesh as Varma
Nutan Prasad as Prasad 
Balaji as James
Pandari Bai as Parvathi 
Rama Prabha as Rama
Srilakshmi as Madhavi's sister 
Athili Lakshmi as Lakshmi
Jhansi as Mandakini 
Samyuktha as Rani
Dubbing Janaki as Varma's mother

Production 
Vasantha Geetam is the debut film for Gautam Raju.

Soundtrack

Music composed by Chakravarthy. Music released on AVM Audio Company.

References

External links 
 

1984 films
1984 romantic drama films
Films directed by Singeetam Srinivasa Rao
Films scored by K. Chakravarthy
Indian romantic drama films
Telugu remakes of Kannada films